Tommy Scott may refer to:

 Tommy Scott (coach) (1907–1962), head American football coach at Old Dominion University
 Tommy Scott (cricketer) (1892–1961), West Indian cricketer
 Ramblin' Tommy Scott (1917–2013), aka "Doc" Tommy Scott, American country and rockabilly musician
 Tommy Scott (English musician) (born 1964), English musician and the lead singer, principal songwriter and guitarist of the Liverpool indie band Space
 Tommy Scott (Scottish musician) (born 1940), Scottish songwriter, producer and singer
 Tommy Scott (police officer), an officer of the Los Angeles Airport police who died in the line of duty
 Tommy Scott and the Senators, a band for which Tom Jones used to be the frontman

See also
 Thomas Scott (disambiguation)
 Tom Scott (disambiguation)